The Men's 100 metres (T37) at the 2014 Commonwealth Games as part of the athletics programme was held at Hampden Park on 28 July 2014. The event was open to Para-sport athletes competing under the T37 classification.

Results

First round
The first round consisted of two heats, with qualification to the finals for the first three in each heat and the two fastest losers over the two heats.

Heat 1

Heat 2

Final

References

Men's 100 metres (T37)
2014 (T37)